Gordon Heath (September 20, 1918 – August 27, 1991) was an American actor and musician who narrated the animated feature film  Animal Farm (1954) and appeared in the title role of The Emperor Jones (1953) and  Othello (1955), both live BBC telecasts, respectively directed by Alvin Rakoff and Tony Richardson.

Biography
Heath was born in New York City, his parents' only child. His father Cyril Gordon Heath had emigrated from Barbados to the US, where he met and married Hattie Hooper. Gordon Heath showed an early talent for both music and art, but opted to pursue an acting career, working on stage and radio. Joining the New York radio station WMCA in 1945 he became the first black staff announcer employed by a major US radio station. In 1945 he appeared on Broadway to great success in the play Deep Are the Roots, written by Arnaud d'Usseau and James Gow, directed by Elia Kazan, and starring Barbara Bel Geddes. The play ran for 447 performances, and when it was subsequently produced in London's West End, Heath reprised his co-starring role in it. After the six-month London run, Heath decided to settle in Paris, France, in 1948.

He also acted in Paris, and in 1950 in London he played Othello on stage and later for BBC Television. He directed an English-speaking production company, the Studio Theater of Paris, for 10 years, from the 1960s.

He and his music and life partner Lee Payant operated a Left Bank café in Paris called L'Abbaye, whose clientele included the actress Rita Hayworth and other celebrities of the era, and where Heath and Payant were the entertainers. Many of the duo's folk albums from the 1950s were recorded there and released on various international labels, including Elektra Records. Payant died on December 14, 1976.

Heath died in Paris after a lengthy illness on August 27, 1991.

Filmography

Select discography
Gordon Heath and Lee Payant Sing Songs of the Abbaye ‒ Elektra (1954)
Chants Tradionnels des Etats-Unis – Editions de la Boite à Musique LD 313 (1955)
Gordon Heath and Lee Payant Sing Encores from the Abbaye ‒ Elektra (1955)
Folksongs and Footnotes – Abbaye Record 1 (1956)
An Evening at L'Abbaye – Elektra (1957)
Abbaye Anniversary Album – Abbaye Record 2 (1959)
Gordon Heath Sings Spirituals – Abbaye Record 3 (1961)

References

Bibliography
Bourne, Stephen. "Heath, Gordon." Who's Who in Contemporary Gay & Lesbian History from World War II to the Present Day. Robert Aldrich and Garry Wotherspoon, eds. London and New York: Routledge, 2001. 183.
Breman, Paul. "Obituary: Gordon Heath." The Independent (London) (September 13, 1991): 26.
Heath, Gordon. Deep Are the Roots: Memoirs of a Black Expatriate. Amherst: The University of Massachusetts Press, 1992.
Shipman, David. "Obituary: Gordon Heath." The Independent (London) (September 2, 1991): 21.

External links
Gordon Heath on lgbtq.com

Illustrated Gordon Heath & Lee Payant discography

1918 births
1991 deaths
African-American male actors
American gay actors
LGBT African Americans
20th-century American male actors
20th-century American musicians
20th-century African-American musicians
20th-century American LGBT people
American expatriates in France